Len Catton (5 January 1914 – 5 February 1986) was a former Australian rules footballer who played with Melbourne and Fitzroy in the Victorian Football League (VFL).

Notes

External links 

1914 births
Australian rules footballers from Victoria (Australia)
Melbourne Football Club players
Fitzroy Football Club players
1986 deaths